Jamie Murray and Bruno Soares were the defending champions, but lost in the quarterfinals to Jean-Julien Rojer and Horia Tecău.

Rojer and Tecău went on to win the title, defeating Feliciano López and Marc López in the final, 6–4, 6–3.

Seeds

Draw

Finals

Top half

Section 1

Section 2

Bottom half

Section 3

Section 4

References

External links
 Men's Doubles main draw
2017 US Open – Men's draws and results at the International Tennis Federation

Men's Doubles
US Open – Men's Doubles
US Open (tennis) by year – Men's doubles